Stratiolaelaps is a genus of mites in the family Laelapidae.

Species
 Stratiolaelaps antennata (Karg, 1993)     
 Stratiolaelaps gibbosus (Koyumdzhieva, 1979)     
 Stratiolaelaps lamington Walter & Campbell, 2003     
 Stratiolaelaps lorna Walter & Campbell, 2003     
 Stratiolaelaps marilyn Walter & Campbell, 2003     
 Stratiolaelaps miles (Berlese, 1892)     
 Stratiolaelaps reticulata Zumpt & Patterson, 1951     
 Stratiolaelaps scimitus (Womersley, 1956)     
 Stratiolaelaps womersleyi Walter & Campbell, 2003

References

Laelapidae